Mewett is a surname. Notable people with the surname include:

 Geri Mewett (born 1974), Bermudian swimmer
 James Mewett (1833–1904), English cricket player
 Noel Mewett (born 1949), Australian Australian rules football player

See also
 Hewett (surname)